Hanff is a surname. Notable people with the surname include:

Helene Hanff (1916–1997), American writer
Jean Hanff Korelitz (born 1961), American novelist, playwright, theater producer and essayist
Johann Nikolaus Hanff (1663–1711), German classical organist and composer

See also
7902 Hanff, main-belt asteroid